Abdul Aziz Al-Marzoug (born 16 July 1975) is a Saudi Arabian former footballer. He competed in the men's tournament at the 1996 Summer Olympics.

References

External links
 
 

1975 births
Living people
Saudi Arabian footballers
Olympic footballers of Saudi Arabia
Footballers at the 1996 Summer Olympics
Al Nassr FC players
Saudi Professional League players
Place of birth missing (living people)
Association football defenders